The Consolidated XB2Y was an American prototype single-engined dive bomber of the 1930s. It was intended to meet a United States Navy requirement for a carrier-based dive bomber, but was unsuccessful, only a single example being built.

Design and development
In 1932, the United States Navy issued a specification for a two-seat carrier-based dive bomber capable of carrying a  bomb. Orders were placed for competing prototypes of designs to meet the Navy's requirement with Consolidated Aircraft and the Great Lakes Aircraft Company in June 1932.

Consolidated's proposal was the Model 24 (or XB2Y in the US Navy's designation system), a single-bay biplane developed from a basic design prepared by the Navy's Bureau of Aeronautics with detailed design led by Consolidated's B Douglas Thomas, formerly Chief Designer of Thomas Morse Aircraft, which had become part of Consolidated Aircraft in 1929.

In order to withstand the high g-forces experienced during pullup after a dive attack, much of the aircraft's center-section was cut from a solid steel block. It was powered by a similar Pratt & Whitney R-1535 Twin Wasp Junior air-cooled radial engine as used by the Great Lakes design, and had a fixed tailwheel undercarriage. The crew of two sat in tandem in separate cockpits, with the observer in the rear cockpit armed with a single flexibly mounted machine gun, and the pilot with a single fixed  synchronized machine gun firing through the aircraft's propeller arc. Its bombload was carried on a crutch under the fuselage that swung down to ensure the bomb would clear the propeller when dropped in a steep dive.

Operational history

The prototype XB2Y-1 (serial number 9221) was completed in 1933, being delivered on 28 June 1933. Testing was unsuccessful, with the aircraft's performance being unsatisfactory, while the aircraft also proved very expensive to build. The US Navy preferred the Great Lakes design, with 60 being ordered as BG-1s.

The XB2Y-1 was modified to a scout configuration, removing the bomb crutch.

Specifications (XB2Y-1)

See also

References

Citations

Bibliography

Donald, David (editor). The Encyclopedia of World Aircraft. Leicester, UK:Blitz Editions, 1997. .
Swanborough, Gordon and Bowers, Peter M. United States Navy Aircraft since 1911. London:Putnam, Second edition 1976. .
"United States Navy Aircraft". Flight, 14 February 1935. pp. 178–179.
Wegg, John. General Dynamics Aircraft and their Predecessors. London:Putnam, 1990. .

External links

Consolidated B2Y
B2Y
Carrier-based aircraft
Single-engined tractor aircraft
Biplanes
Aircraft first flown in 1933